Robert Paul Burns (September 1, 1878 – January 16, 1966) was an American film actor and director. He appeared in more than 200 films between 1908 and 1952 as well as directing 13 films between 1915 and 1916. Burns was born in Philadelphia, Pennsylvania and died in Los Angeles, California. He played Pokes in the Pokes and Jabbs silent comedies of the mid 1910s, with Walter Stull as Jabbs and frequently featuring Babe (Oliver) Hardy. Later supporting Oliver Hardy again in his partnership with Stan Laurel at the Hal Roach Studios in several of their early short comedies and feature films.

Selected filmography

 Uncivil War Birds (1946) as Union Soldier (uncredited)
 Gents Without Cents (1944) Audience Member (uncredited)
 Air Raid Wardens (1943) as Townsman in Gymnasium (uncredited)
 Loco Boy Makes Good (1942) as Nightclub Patron (uncredited)
 I'll Never Heil Again (1941) as King's aide (uncredited)
 Healthy, Wealthy and Dumb (1938) as Room service waiter (uncredited)
 Dizzy Doctors (1937) as Man in the Wheelchair (uncredited)
 Jail Bait (1937) as Prison Warden (uncredited)
 A Pain in the Pullman (1936) as Man in Berth (uncredited)
 Dummy Ache (1936) as Gardner (uncredited)
 Ants in the Pantry (1936) as Guest with mouse down his back (uncredited)
 Pop Goes the Easel (1935) as Professor Fueller (uncredited)
 Restless Knights (1935) as Guard (uncredited)
 Them Thar Hills (1934) as Officer (uncredited)
 Three Little Pigskins (1934) as Man panhandled by Larry (uncredited)
 Babes In Toyland (1934) as Townsman (uncredited)
 Helpmates (1932) as Neighbor with hose (uncredited)
 The Chimp (1932) as Tenant (uncredited)
 Any Old Port! (1932) as Justice of peace (uncredited)                                                                                                                         
 Pardon Us (1931) as Prisoner with toothache (uncredited)
 The Laurel-Hardy Murder Case (1930) as Nervous Relative (uncredited)
 Below Zero (1930) as "Blind" Man/Deadbeat diner (uncredited)
 Another Fine Mess (1930) as Bicyclist (uncredited)
 The Try Out (1916) as Pokes                                                                                                                                              
 Hired and Fired (1916) as Pokes
 Busted Hearts (1916) as Pokes
 Frenzied Finance (1916) as Pokes                                                                                                                                           
 Chickens (1916) as Pokes
 This Way Out (1916) as Pokes
 Ups and Downs (1915) as Pokes
 Mixed and Fixed (1915) as Pokes
 Speed Kings (1915) as Pokes
 Strangled Harmony (1915) as Pokes
 Love, Pepper and Sweets (1915) as Pokes
 Pressing Business (1915) as Pokes
 The Midnight Prowlers (1915) as Pokes

External links

1878 births
1966 deaths
American male film actors
American male silent film actors
Male actors from Philadelphia
Film directors from Pennsylvania
Hal Roach Studios actors
20th-century American male actors